Escadron électronique aéroporté 00.054 Dunkerque is an electronic warfare unit of the French Air and Space Force equipped with the Transall C-160G "Gabriel"s and Beechcraft King Air 350ER "Vader"s. It was stationed at Metz-Frescaty Air Base (BA 128) until it was transférred to Évreux-Fauville Air Base (BA 105).

Designations 
 1964 : Escadrille électronique 00.054
 1985 : Escadron électronique 00.054
 1988 : Escadron électronique 01.054
 2006 : Escadron électronique aéroporté 11.054
 September 2009 : Escadron électronique aéroporté 00.054.

Aircraft 
The squadron was equipped with eight Nord 2501 "Gabriel" ; the first operational flight of a Nord "Gabriel" took place in October 1962. The last flight took place on 5 October 1989.

Since 1989, the Transall Gabriel or C160G has replaced the Nord Gabriel. Only two aircraft of the type are in service.

The first Beechcraft King Air 350ER "Vader" arrived on August 6, 2020.

See also 
 List of French Air and Space Force aircraft squadrons

References 

French Air and Space Force squadrons
Military units and formations established in 1964